Alli Danielle Linnehan (born September 16, 1999) is an American professional volleyball player who plays as an outside hitter for the United States women's national volleyball team and French professional team Neptunes de Nantes.

Early life

Linnehan grew up in Floyds Knobs, Indiana and played volleyball and basketball for her high school at Christian Academy of Indiana, helping lead them to a state volleyball title in her second year.

Career

College

Linnehan chose to play volleyball for Kentucky, crediting her choosing the school because it was the first school to offer her a scholarship, as well as some of her family being fans of the school. She graduated from Kentucky in May 2022 summa cum laude with a degree in elementary education. 

Linnehan was named SEC Freshman of the Year in 2018 after helping Kentucky to a conference title. During the season, she had 12 matches with double-digit kills and averaged 2.37 kills per. Following her sophomore season in 2019, Linnehan earned her first AVCA All-American award, being named to third team, after averaging 3.36 kills per set during the season. 

Linnehan was named an AVCA First Team All-American in 2020 after leading the Wildcats in kills per set during her junior season. She helped Kentucky win its first ever NCAA National Championship the same year, and was a finalist for the Senior CLASS Award in women's volleyball. She had 26 kills in the championship match versus Texas, with her final kill coming on the championship winning point. She was named a second team All-American in 2021 after helping Kentucky to another SEC title, and was named the conference player of the year, recording 4.09 points per set during the conference season.

Professional clubs

 Neptunes de Nantes (2022–)

Linnehan will play for Neptunes de Nantes in the 2022–2023 professional season.

USA National Team 

Linnehan made her national team debut in September 2022 at the NORCECA Pan American Cup Final Six tournament, winning a silver medal with the team.

References

1999 births
Living people
Volleyball players from Indiana
Outside hitters
American women's volleyball players
Kentucky Wildcats women's volleyball players
American expatriate sportspeople in France
Expatriate volleyball players in France